The 2020–21 season is Hull City's first season back in League One, the third tier of English football, and their 117th year in existence. Alongside League One, the club participated in the FA Cup, EFL Cup and EFL Trophy.

Background
Hull were relegated to League One having finished bottom of the Championship in the 2019–20 season. The delayed end to the 2019–20 season, due to the COVID-19 pandemic, had a knock-on to the 2020–21 season start which was scheduled for the weekend of 12 September 2020.

Events
 On 23 July 2020, the club announced the release of Will Mannion, Robbie McKenzie, Kevin Stewart and Jon Toral.
 On 23 July 2020, Angus MacDonald was offered a new contract, but on 15 August 2020 he signed a two-year contract with Rotherham United.
 On 7 August 2020, Lewie Coyle joined on a three-year deal from Fleetwood Town for an undisclosed fee.
 On 7 August 2020, Josh Emmanuel joined on a two-year deal from Bolton Wanderers on a free transfer.
 On 11 August 2020, Richie Smallwood joined the club on a two-year deal from Blackburn Rovers on a free transfer.
 On 20 August 2020, Elliot Bonds joined Cheltenham Town on a season-long loan, but this was cut short when he ruptured his anterior cruciate ligament in the game against Scunthorpe United on 20 October 2020.
 On 20 August 2020, Greg Docherty of Rangers signed a three-year deal with the club for an undisclosed fee.
 On 27 August 2020, Richie Smallwood was appointed as captain for the season.
 On 2 September 2020, Ryan Tafazolli signed a three-year deal with Wycombe Wanderers for an undisclosed fee.
 On 4 September 2020, Alfie Jones of Southampton signed a one-year deal with the club for an undisclosed fee.
 On 10 September 2020, Leo Lopes left the club to join Belgium club Cercle Brugge for an undisclosed fee.
 On 14 September 2020, Thomas Mayer joined on a two-year contract from Austria Lustenau on a free transfer.
 On 16 September 2020, following a successful application to the EFL, the match against Crewe Alexandra was selected as a test event for the return of supporters following the COVID-19 restrictions. But Hull City Council would not grant permission for the pilot as there had been a significant increase of coronavirus infection rate in the area during the previous week.
 On 24 September 2020, Hakeeb Adelakun of Bristol City signed on loan for the rest of the season, but was recalled by Bristol on 4 January 2021.
 On 30 September 2020, Regan Slater joined on a season-long loan from Sheffield United.
 On 16 October 2020, Keane Lewis-Potter was named the EFL Young Player of the Month award for September.
 On 12 November 2020, Jacob Greaves signed a new three-year contract with the club.
 On 27 November 2020, Billy Chadwick signed a new one-and-a-half-year deal with the club.
 On 30 November 2020, Brandon Fleming signed a new two-and-a-half-year deal with the club.
 On 19 December 2020, Billy Chadwick joined FC Halifax Town on a month-long loan, but was recalled on 14 January 2021.
 On 6 January 2021, Callum Jones signed a new two-and-a-half-year contract.
 On 13 January 2021, Jordan Flores joined on a free transfer from Dundalk, signing an 18-month contract.
 On 14 January 2021, Jordy de Wijs moved on loan to Queens Park Rangers for the remainder of the season.
 On 14 January 2021, Gavin Whyte joined on loan from Cardiff City for the rest of the season.
 On 18 January 2021, Daniel Crowley joined on loan for the remainder of the season from Birmingham City.
 On 18 January 2021, Keane Lewis-Potter signed a new contract until summer 2023.
 On 18 January 2021, Max Sheaf went on loan to Torquay United until the end of season.
 On 1 February 2021, Martin Samuelsen moved on loan to Aalborg BK for the rest of the season.
 On 1 February 2021, Max Clark returned to Hull City on a short-term deal to the end of the season from Vitesse.
 On 1 February 2021, Jordan Hickey left the club after his contract was cancelled by mutual consent.
 On 1 February 2021, David Milinković's move to Vancouver Whitecaps was make permanent after a clause in his loan contract was triggered.
 On 1 February 2021, Daniel Batty moved to Fleetwood Town after his contract was terminated by mutual consent.
 On 2 February 2021, Danny Lupano moved on loan to Derry City until the end of season.
 On 2 February 2021, Harvey Cartwright signed a new three-year deal with the club.
 On 12 February 2021, Grant McCann was named EFL League One Manager of the Month for January.
 On 5 March 2021, Sean McLoughlin, signed a new three-year contract with the club.
 On 5 March 2021, Billy Chadwick returned to FC Halifax Town for a month-long loan spell, which was extended to the end of the season on 29 March 2021.
 On 23 March 2021, Ahmed Salam signed a new one-year contract with the club.
 On 24 April 2021, City secured an immediate return to the EFL Championship, with two games to play, after a 2–1 win against  a Lincoln City.
 On 29 April 2021, at the EFL Awards ceremony, Grant McCann secured the EFL League One Manager of the Season award, while Callum Elder and George Honeyman were included in the EFL League One Team of the Season.
 On 1 May 2021, Hull's 3–1 home win against Wigan Athletic secured the league title, their first in 55 years.
 On 7 May 2021, Grant McCann was named EFL League One Manager of the Month and Josh Magennis was named EFL League One Player of the Month for April.
 On 10 May 2021, Harry Wood signed a two-year contract with the club.
 On 13 May 2021, Jordy de Wijs signed permanently for Queens Park Rangers on a three-year deal.
 On 18 May 2021, the club announced that they had exercised the option of a one-year contract extension for Josh Magennis and Alfie Jones. While all other first-team players were to be retained, apart from Max Clark who would leave at the end of the season. New contracts were under discussion with George Long, Reece Burke and Elliot Bonds, while Matty Jacob has signed a one-year contract extension with the club.
 On 24 May 2021, Grant McCann was named League One Manager of the Year by the League Managers Association.
 On 25 May 2021, it was announced that George Long had opted not to sign a new contract with the club and instead signed for Millwall on a free transfer.
 On 2 June 2021, it was announced that Reece Burke would join Luton Town next season on a free transfer.
 On 7 June 2021, George Moncur signed, from Luton Town, on a two-year deal with the option of a further year.
 On 9 June 2021, Alfie Jones signed a new two-year deal with the club.
 On 16 June 2021, Andy Cannon signed a two-year deal with Hull City, the club holding an option for a further year.
 On 16 June 2021, it was announced that Callum Jones would join Morecambe on a season-long loan.
 On 17 June 2021, Randell Williams signed a two-year deal with Hull City, the club holding an option for a further year.
 On 22 June 2021, Jordan Flores signed a season-long loan deal with Northampton Town.
 On 25 June 2021, Nathan Baxter of Chelsea, signed a year-long loan deal with the club.

Players

Current squad

Out on loan

Transfers

Transfers in

Loans in

Transfers out

Loans out

Pre-season
Pre-season training started on 10 August 2020 at the club's Cottingham training ground.
A week long training camp followed at Oriam in Edinburgh, Scotland.

Competitions

Overall

League One

The first matches of the 2020–21 season are scheduled to take place on 12 September 2020 with the season concluding on the weekend of 8 to 9 May 2021. The fixtures for the season were released at 9:00 a.m. on 21 August 2020, with Hull starting the season with an away match at the Priestfield Stadium to play Gillingham and ends with another away trip to play Charlton Athletic at The Valley.

Hull opened the season with 3 wins which equalled the record that has stood since 28 August 1948 when they beat Mansfield Town 3–0 in Division Three North.

Because of the ongoing COVID-19 pandemic the EFL changed the rules on substitutes from 20 November 2020, for the remainder of the season, to allow 7 substitutes to be named per match, with up to 5 being allowed to be used.

League table

Results summary

Results by matchday

Matches

FA Cup

Hull entered the cup in round one, the draw for which took place on 26 October 2020. Hull were drawn at home to Fleetwood Town. The match took place on 7 November 2020 with a 3:00 kick-off. The game started with a minutes silence as part of the Remembrance Day commemorations. The first action was in the third-minute when Fleetwood's Ched Evans collided with Callum Elder and after a long delay was stretchered off the field. Hull struck in the 31st-minute through a Josh Magennis volley. A second blow for Fleetwood, just before half-time, saw Harvey Saunders clash with George Long and him also being stretchered off the field. Following the break Hull went further ahead through a Reece Burke header of a Callum Elder corner. The game finished 2–0 in Hull City's favour and allowed them to progress to the second round draw. The second round draw was made on Monday, 9 November by Danny Cowley, with Hull drawn away to Stevenage. The match took place on 29 November 2020, the first half saw both keepers making saves to keep the game scoreless at the break. Early in the second half Arthur Iontton brought down Martin Samuelsen in the box and Hull were awarded a penalty that was converted by Tom Eaves. Elliott List brought the home-side level in the 79th-minute. With neither side able to find another goal the match went to extra-time and then to penalties, Sevenage running out winners 6–5.

EFL Cup

The first round of the EFL Cup is scheduled to take place on 5 September 2020 with the draw taking place at 10:00 a.m. on 18 August 2020. Hull City are in the northern section of the draw and were drawn away to Sunderland. Sunderland started the match with several attempts in the first half but Hull kept a clean sheet. In the second half Sunderland's Will Grigg had a goal disallowed for off-side and as neither side broke the dead-lock the match went to penalties. Grigg took the first penalty and hit the legs of goalkeeper Matt Ingram, the remainder of the penalties were converted and Hull progressed to the second round. The draw for both the second and third round were confirmed on 6 September, live on Sky Sports by Phil Babb. Hull were drawn away to Leeds United in round two with the match taking place week commencing 14 September 2020. It was later confirmed that the match would take place on 16 September. If they progress then in round three they will face either West Ham United or Charlton Athletic. That game took place on 15 September 2020, with West Ham United securing a 3–0 win to progress to round three.

The following day Hull travelled to Elland Road to take on Leeds United and started well with Mallik Wilks opening the scoring with a deflected shot after 5-minutes. Though they had several chances they could not add to their lead. Leeds meanwhile had few chances, but deep into stoppage time Ezgjan Alioski levelled the score and took the match to penalties. With each side missing one penalty of their set of five it went to sudden death. Jamie Shackleton missed penalty ten for Leeds leaving Alfie Jones to convert his spot-kick to put Hull through to the third round 9–8 on penalties.

The third round match against West Ham United took place at the London Stadium on 22 November 2020. Before the game United manager David Moyes and two players, Issa Diop and Josh Cullen, had to leave the stadium after testing positive for coronavirus. West Ham opened the scoring through ex-tiger Robert Snodgrass hitting the net after 18-minutes. Sébastien Haller doubled their lead on the stroke of half-time. Sean McLoughlin conceded a penalty that Andriy Yarmolenko converted for West Ham's third 5-minutes after the break before Mallik Wilks replied for Hull in the 70th-minute. Both Yarmolenko and Haller got on the score-sheet in added time to put West Ham through to the fourth round 5–1.

EFL Trophy

The regional group stage draw was confirmed at 1.30 p.m. on 18 August 2020. Hull were placed in Group H of the northern section along with Grimsby Town, Harrogate Town and Leicester City U21. Hull topped the group table and were guaranteed a home game in the second round, the draw for which took place on 20 November 2020. Hull were drawn to play Crewe Alexandra with the match taking place week beginning 7 December 2020. The match took place on 8 December 2020, but the match remained deadlocked at full-time with neither side managing to score a goal. The match went to penalties and Hull squeezed through 3–2 on penalties. The draw for the third round took place on 10 December 2020 and Hull were again drawn at home this time to Fleetwood Town. The match took place on 12 January 2021, Fleetwood got off to a good start with Paddy Madden netting after 8-minutes. Wes Burns doubled their lead soon after the break. Hull left it late to reply with Mallik Wilks finding the net in the 78th-minute, with Keane Lewis-Potter levelling the score two minutes later. In extra-time Lewie Coyle scored his first goal for the club, an absolute thunderbolt, to put Hull through to the next round with a score of 3–2. On 22 January 2021, it was announced that the draw for the quarter-finals of the cup would take place the following day,  Sam Parkin doing the draw. Matches would take place week-commencing 1 February 2021. Hull were again drawn at home this time to Lincoln City. The date for the match was later confirmed as 2 February 2021. Lincoln got off to a good start when Harry Anderson scored after 7-minutes. Hull levelled through Greg Docherty after 60-minutes. Both teams pressed but could not break the deadlock and the match went to penalties. Lincoln went through 3–4 on penalties.

Group table

Matches

Statistics

Appearances

Note: Appearances shown after a "+" indicate player came on during course of match.

Top goalscorers

Disciplinary record

Line-ups

Kits
On 25 September 2020, the club announced that local company Giacom will be the main shirt sponsors for the 2020–21 season. The following day the club unveiled the new home kit for the season, the shirts described as "classic amber and black stripes with solid amber sleeves". The shorts are to be black with amber side panels while the socks are amber with black cuff top.

The third kit was revealed on 9 September 2020, as a white shirt with Ibiza Blue upper chest and sleeves. The shorts are Ibiza Blue with white trim and the socks being white with Ibiza Blue cuff top.

The away kit was revealed on 17 September 2020, as a carbon grey and black pattern forming a KCOM Stadium stanchion pattern on the shirt. The shorts are black with vertical amber tipping, while the socks are black with amber hoops.

Awards
The annual awards for the club saw George Honeyman pick-up the Player of the Year, Players' Player of the Year and Supporters' Player of the Year awards.
Lewie Coyle was presented with the Goal of the Season award for his goal against Fleetwood Town on 12 January 2021 in the EFL Trophy. Jacob Greaves took the award for Young Player of the Year.

Notes

References

Hull City A.F.C. seasons
Hull City
2020s in Kingston upon Hull